The first season of The Masked Singer Vietnam was aired on HTV2 and VieON from 16 July 2022 to 19 November 2022. 

The winner of this season is Ngọc Mai, a singer and vocal coach who is in the mascot character "O Sen (Ms. Lotus)", while runner-up is belonged to singer Hà Trần with the mascot character "Phượng Hoàng Lửa (Fire Phoenix)" and top 3 belonged to singer Myra Trần with the mascot character "Lady Mây (Lady Cloud)".

Panelists and host 

The panelists and the host for season 1 was announced on 6 July 2022. Actor Trấn Thành, singer Tóc Tiên, rapper Wowy served as the main panelists, while singer Ngô Kiến Huy served as the host of the season. However, due to the schedule as well as professional limitations, Wowy only appeared in the first two rounds of the show (until the end of episode 9), and from episode 10, Đức Phúc was a replacement main panelist. 

In addition, the guest panelist also appears in the show and changes in each episode, with Minh Hằng is the first guest panelist of the show. Among the main panelists throughout are Trấn Thành and Tóc Tiên (excluding Wowy, because he is no longer present after round 2), there is also have the "Golden Ears" award for the best panelist of each season. In this season, the winner is Tóc Tiên when she correctly guessing the true identity of 7/15 characters, while Trấn Thành only correctly guesses the identity of 6/15 characters.

Contestants 
The show's contestants are all revealed by the program from the beginning of July 2022. In this season, 15 contestants are divided into three groups: A, B and C. According to the show, each character hidden behind the mask are celebrities, with several awards and famous singles. Besides the mascot characters participating in the show, in the semi-final episode, the supporting mascots also appeared to support the main mascot characters in their repertoire. Each main mascot character will have one, or even a group of support mascot characters.

Notes

References

External links 

 

Vietnamese television programmes
Reality television
Vietnamese-language television shows
Ho Chi Minh City Television original programming